2 Brothers is a 2019 Thai television series starring  (Tao), Suradet Piniwat (Bas) and Dhanundhorn Neerasingh (Fang).

Directed by Ekkasit Trakulkasemsuk and produced by Star Hunter Studio, the series premiered on GMM 25 and LINE TV on 16 February 2019, airing on Saturdays at 21:25 ICT. The series concluded on 11 May 2019.

Cast and characters 
Below are the cast of the series:

Main 
  (Tao) as Pete / Chanan
 Suradet Piniwat (Bas) as Tony
 Dhanundhorn Neerasingh (Fang) as Kaopun

Supporting 
 Prachakorn Piyasakulkaew (Sun) as Badin
 Theewara Panyatara (Bank) as Bad
 Suttatip Wutchaipradit (Ampere) as Pancake
 Chomchai Chatwilai (Add) as Grandmother Sompit
 Ampha Phoosit as Jam
 Ratawan Aomtisong (Min) as Brownie
 Naerunchara Lertprasert (Neko) as Pat
 Methakorn Supapantaree (Ice) as Taro
 Krit Atthaseri (Kling) as Theeradeth, Badin's father

Guest role 
 Suppapong Udomkaewkanjana (Saint) as Phat (Ep. 12)

Soundtracks

References

External links 
 
 2 Brothers on LINE TV

Thai romantic comedy television series
Thai drama television series
2019 Thai television series debuts
2019 Thai television series endings
GMM 25 original programming